The Mystery of Bangalore (German: Das Rätsel von Bangalor) is a 1918 German silent film directed by Alexander Antalffy and Paul Leni and starring Conrad Veidt, Gilda Langer and Harry Liedtke. It is a lost film.

Cast 
 Conrad Veidt as Dinja
 Gilda Langer as Ellen, the governor's daughter
 Harry Liedtke as Archie Douglas

References

Bibliography 
 Isenberg, Noah William. Weimar Cinema: An Essential Guide to Classic Films of the Era. Columbia University Press, 2009.

External links 

1918 films
1910s German-language films
Films of the German Empire
German silent feature films
Films directed by Alexander Antalffy
Films directed by Paul Leni
German black-and-white films
1910s German films